The Desert of the Lost is a 1927 American silent Western film directed by Richard Thorpe and starring Hal Taliaferro, Peggy Montgomery and Edward Cecil.

Synopsis
Having shot a man in self-defense and fled across the border into Mexico with a sheriff and his posse on his tail, an outlaw is forced to head out into the desert.

Cast
 Hal Taliaferro as Jim Drake 
 Peggy Montgomery as Dolores Wolfe 
 William J. Dyer as Steve Wolfe 
 Edward Cecil as Detective Murray 
 Richard Neill as El Chino
 Tom Bay as Townsman
 George Magrill as Henchman 
 Lafe McKee as Boat Captain 
 Ray Murro as Juan - the Half-Breed 
 Slim Whitaker as Sheriff

References

External links
 

1927 films
1927 Western (genre) films
Films directed by Richard Thorpe
1920s English-language films
American black-and-white films
Pathé Exchange films
Films set in Mexico
Silent American Western (genre) films
1920s American films